Telekinesis is a term used in parapsychology as either an alternate for psychokinesis or as the name of a specialty ability under the umbrella term of psychokinesis, to refer to using the power of the mind to cause the movement of matter at a distance.

Telekinesis may also refer to:

 Telekinesis (band), an indie rock band based in Seattle, Washington
 Telekinesis!, the debut album by the band Telekinesis
 Telekinesis (comics), a DC Comics superhero